Chana masala, chole masala, or chole is a chickpea curry originating in the Indian subcontinent. It is a staple dish in North Indian cuisine.

Ingredients 

Along with chickpeas, the ingredients of chana masala typically include onion, chopped tomatoes, ghee, cumin, turmeric, coriander powder, garlic, chillies, ginger, amchoor or lemon juice, and garam masala.

Preparation 
To prepare chana masala, raw chickpeas are soaked overnight in water. They are then drained, rinsed, and cooked with onions, tomatoes, and spices.

References 

Indian snack foods
Pakistani snack foods
North Indian cuisine
Indian fast food
Pakistani cuisine
Punjabi cuisine
Chickpea dishes